Matt Patrick (born June 15, 1974, Minneapolis, Minnesota) is an American record producer, studio owner, engineer, singer-songwriter and multi-instrumentalist. He grew up in the small community of North Branch, Minnesota, about an hour north of Minneapolis/St. Paul. Early on Patrick learned how to play piano, electric, acoustic and bass guitars and sing. After high school he began learning other instruments such as mandolin, accordion, dobro, pedal steel, Hammond organ, and various electronic synthesizers.

Patrick was the bass player and co-songwriter for the band pegtop (1995–2002) and also gave the group their distinct vocal harmonies. Patrick recorded five albums with pegtop, producing the latest two studio albums (Run, Run and The Counting Tree).

In 2002, Patrick recorded his first solo CD, titled Change, in several studios in the Twin Cities, including his basement studio, then enlisted Tom Herbers to mix. Some of the musicians on this album were Adam Levy (The Honeydogs), Randy Broughten (Gear Daddies, Trailer Trash, Cactus Blossoms) on pedal steel, Jeremy Ylvisaker, Bruce Balgaard, Brian Mangum and Chris DeWan, who were regular members of his band at that time. His album received very favorable reviews from national and international press.

2005 brought the release of his second album, Time Flies, which he recorded and mixed entirely in his home studio. In an attempt to search for sonically unique recordings, Patrick stumbled upon the works of Brian Eno and Daniel Lanois, and joined their quest for subtlety and beauty in the process of ambient recording. Brian A. Smith from the online publication Phantom Tollbooth gave Time Flies a rating of 4½ out of 5.

Alongside his own original material, Patrick has co-written songs with numerous people and has appeared as a guest musician on two Sara Groves albums (All Right Here and The Other Side of Something).

In 2005, Patrick moved to Bratislava, Slovakia to spend a year teaching English and music. Immediately following his return to the U.S., he started his first commercial recording studio, called Two Pillars. After a year and a half there he upgraded his studio to a much larger commercial space in the arts district of Northeast Minneapolis. He named the studio "The Library", as it has several thousand books that line the walls of each tracking room.

He also plays electric guitar in the band Greycoats. Various songs have been featured on several television shows including Orange is the New Black, Teen Mom, Gossip Girl, and 16 and Pregnant. Patrick has produced, engineered, mixed, and played various instruments on all four albums for Greycoats: Setting Fire to the Great Unknown (2009), World of Tomorrow (2013), Adrift (2015) and Charisma (2018). He is the electric guitarist for the band Fathom Lane, and also produced and mixed their 2017 release, Asilomar. The listeners of Twin Cities radio station 89.3 The Current voted Fathom Lane's song, "Fingers and Toes", the number one local song in their Top 89 of 2017.

Currently, Patrick is a full-time record producer at his recording studio, the Library, in northeast Minneapolis. Some of the artists who have recorded there include Jeremy Messersmith, John Mark Nelson, Jeremy Ylvisaker with "Guitar Party," and Red House Records artists The Pines. 

He has been nominated for best record producer for the Independent Music Awards in 2015 for Jourdan Myers Ruin Me With Love, 2016 for Greycoats Adrift, and in 2017 for Vicky Emerson Wake Me When The Wind Dies Down.

Work

Discography
Change, 2002
Time Flies, 2005
The Rest of Right Now (Put Down the Muffin), 2005
Setting Fire to the Great Unknown (Greycoats), 2008
World of Tomorrow (Greycoats), 2013
Charged Particles (Put Down the Muffin), 2014
How I Killed A Bear (MaSSs), 2015
Adrift (Greycoats), 2015
Charisma (Greycoats), 2018

References

External links
 The Library Recording Studio
 Matt Patrick on Myspace
 Official Greycoats website
 MattPatrick.com (via archive.org)

1974 births
Living people
American multi-instrumentalists
Record producers from Minnesota
American audio engineers
Musicians from Saint Paul, Minnesota
People from North Branch, Minnesota